Bohdan John Danylo (born May 27, 1971) is a bishop of the Catholic Church in the United States.  He has served as the Eparch of Ukrainian Catholic Eparchy of Saint Josaphat in Parma since 2014. In March 2015, he was the youngest U.S. Catholic bishop in active ministry, at age 43.

Biography
Bohdan John Danylo was born in Giżycko, Poland.  He began his studies for the priesthood in Poland where he studied philosophy in Lublin.  After moving to the United States he completed his theological studies at The Catholic University of America in Washington, D.C.

Danylo was ordained a priest for the Ukrainian Catholic Eparchy of Stamford on October 1, 1996, by Bishop Basil H. Losten. He spent a year at St. Michael's Parish in Hartford, Connecticut before he was named the Vice-Rector of the Seminary of St. Basil's Cathedral in Stamford, Connecticut.  He furthered his education at Saint Vladimir's Orthodox Theological Seminary in Crestwood, New York and at the Pontifical University of Saint Thomas Aquinas in Rome where he earned a Licentiate of Sacred Theology.

Pope Francis named Danylo as the second bishop of Saint Josaphat in Parma on August 7, 2014. He was consecrated a bishop by Major Archbishop Sviatoslav Shevchuk of Kyiv-Galicia on November 4, 2014. The principal co-consecrators were auxiliary bishop John Bura of Philadelphia and Bishop Paul Patrick Chomnycky, O.S.B.M. of Stamford.

See also
 

 Catholic Church hierarchy
 Catholic Church in the United States
 Historical list of the Catholic bishops of the United States
 List of Catholic bishops of the United States
 Lists of patriarchs, archbishops, and bishops

References

External links

Ukrainian Catholic Eparchy of Parma Official Site

Episcopal succession

1971 births
Living people
People from Giżycko
Polish emigrants to the United States
Catholic University of America alumni
Pontifical University of Saint Thomas Aquinas alumni
Bishops of the Ukrainian Greek Catholic Church
American Eastern Catholic bishops
21st-century Eastern Catholic bishops
Bishops appointed by Pope Francis